The tracheoesophageal stripe is formed by the posterior wall of the trachea and the anterior wall of the esophagus. This line is best identified on the lateral chest x-ray. When this line is greater than 5 mm it is considered abnormal.

The most common cause of a thickened tracheoesophageal stripe is esophageal carcinoma, however, lymphadenopathy likely cannot be excluded and further evaluation with additional imaging is recommended.

References
http://www.meddean.luc.edu/lumen/MedEd/MEDICINE/PULMONAR/cxr/atlas/testripe1.htm

Human head and neck